Legionowo railway station is a railway station in Legionowo, Poland. As of 2011, it is served by Koleje Mazowieckie, who run the KM9 services from Warszawa Zachodnia or Warszawa Wola to Działdowo, Szybka Kolej Miejska, who run the S9 services from Warszawa Gdańska to Wieliszew and by Tanie Linie Kolejowe by their cross-country services to Kraków, Kołobrzeg, Olsztyn, Bielsko-Biała, Gdynia and also to Warszawa Zachodnia.

A major redevelopment of the station has been made between 2014 and 2016 with a large amount of the funding coming from Swiss Contribution. It included a transport hub, a multi-storey car park, shops and more.

Train services
The station is served by the following service(s):

 Intercity services (IC) Łódź Fabryczna — Warszawa — Gdańsk Glowny — Kołobrzeg
Intercity services (IC) Olsztyn - Warszawa - Skierniewice - Łódź
Intercity services (IC) Olsztyn - Warszawa - Skierniewice - Częstochowa - Katowice - Bielsko-Biała
Intercity services (IC) Olsztyn - Warszawa - Skierniewice - Częstochowa - Katowice - Gliwice - Racibórz
Intercity services (TLK) Gdynia Główna — Zakopane 
Intercity services (TLK) Kołobrzeg — Gdynia Główna — Warszawa Wschodnia — Kraków Główny

References
Station article at kolej.one.pl

External links 
 

Railway stations in Poland opened in 1877
Railway stations in Masovian Voivodeship
Railway stations served by Koleje Mazowieckie
Railway stations served by Szybka Kolej Miejska (Warsaw)
Railway station